Donghicola eburneus is a bacterium from the genus of Donghicola which has been isolated from seawater from the Sea of Japan from Jeongdongjin in Korea.

References 

Rhodobacteraceae
Bacteria described in 2007